The Santora is a historic commercial building located in Downtown Historic District of Santa Ana, California. It now houses art galleries, retail stores, and restaurants.

Architecture
The building was designed by Frank Lansdowne, one of the premier architects of the region, and groundbreaking on it took place on July 7, 1928. It is in the California Churrigueresque style of Spanish Colonial Revival architecture.

The Santora is listed in the National Register of Historic Places, and its record number is 386426.

History
From 1934 until 1944, Daninger's Tea Room occupied the rooms on the second floor, southwest corner.  The restaurant was famous for its home cooked meals and pleasant atmosphere, and attracted a clientele that included Hollywood celebrities Jack Benny, Milton Berle, Billie Burke, Charles Ruggles, Connie Haines, Lucille Ball, Gracie Allen,  George 
Burns, Joan Davis, Rosalind Russell, Robert Young, William Holden and Alan Ladd, all of whom signed the guest book.

After a period of decline in Santa Ana's downtown the Santora resurged as an arts complex where a number of different artists moved in including Joseph Musil and his Salon of the Art Deco Theaters. Musil was a set designer for the Walt Disney company and worked on the El Capitan Theatre in Hollywood.

See also
National Register of Historic Places listings in Orange County, California

References

External links
Santa Ana History: The Santora
Santa Ana Sentinel — The Santora, Santa Ana’s Museum of Latin American Art

Buildings and structures in Santa Ana, California
History of Santa Ana, California
Commercial buildings completed in 1928
California Historical Landmarks
Commercial buildings on the National Register of Historic Places in California
National Register of Historic Places in Orange County, California
Spanish Revival architecture in California
1928 establishments in California